The Battle of Stockton, took place on 10 September 1933 at the Market Cross in the High Street of Stockton-on-Tees, County Durham, England. It was a clash between members of the British Union of Fascists (BUF) and anti-fascist demonstrators from the small local Communist Party and National Unemployed Workers Movement. The demonstration was an early attempt by the BUF to raise support in the area, but the Communist Party drove them out.

Background
Stockton was hit hard  by the economic recession following the Great Depression. In June 1933 Oswald Mosely announced an offensive, aiming to expand the BUF beyond its Headquarters in London and base in Manchester. George Short, the Communist Party District Organiser for Teesside had spent almost three years at the International Lenin School in Moscow. On his return, in late 1931, he threw himself into political activism on Teesside.

The Stockton Magistrates had banned George's NUWM Saturday evening surgeries that were held at the Market Cross on Stockton's High Street, these surgeries were to assist the unemployed, especially fighting the despised 'Means Test'. In response George relocated, he helped the unemployed in the Churchyard of The Holy Trinity Church and held his political meetings at the Five Lamps in Thornaby. As only the NUWM and CPGB were barred from holding meetings at the Market Cross George and his wife Phyllis organised a series of sit-down protests. In April 1933 George and  Phyllis were arrested for defying the ban and speaking at the Market Cross, both George and Phyllis were charged with disturbing the peace, and she was additionally charged with assaulting a policeman.

"I was in prison when the first attempt by the Mosley fascists to organise their first meeting on Teesside happened, and that was in Stockton, they held a meeting on Stockton's Cross, and whilst it was a rowdy meeting, they carried it off." 

On his release George and Phyllis planned and organised 'real resistance' to the next BUF meeting.

Events
The BUF's North East Organiser, Michael Jordan, planned to speak at the Market Cross on Sunday 10 September 1933, asking for support for his dozen local members, he was sent a senior BUF speaker, the National Propaganda Officer, Captain Vincent Collier. Also sent to Stockton were twenty Tyneside members and sixty from Manchester's newly formed 'Defence Force', these latter wore a black shirt as a uniform, later used by the BUF as a whole. When Collier and his 100 men arrived at Stockton's Market Cross he found it occupied by George Short and a peaceful crowd of up to 3000 supporters. Collier was prevented from speaking by the hecklers – the police report states "The hecklers were exclusively CP and NUWM members." The Police immediately ordered the meeting to be abandoned and escorted the BUF back to their buses at St. John's Crossing.

"The Fascists appeared to be keen on fighting and we had to give them a sharp reminder to get moving and get away out of the town before any further damage was done".

As the BUF withdrew a handful of the Blackshirts attacked individuals in the crowd, this resulted in isolated pockets of fighting which Collier elaborated upon for the newspapers, who eagerly repeated his fabrications. Michael Jordan in his later report places the blame for the fighting firmly on the Manchester Defence Force, and one leader in particular.

"I was approached by an officer who told me our men had come for a fight and it would break their hearts if they were allowed to go back to Manchester without one. He stated he was from London Headquarters and would take the responsibility. I informed him that I was in charge of the area and would not stand for innocent people being bludgeoned, He deliberately attacked one of the crowd with the result that a riot started in a few seconds."

George Short's grandson gives an indication as to why the Teesside Communists were so successful; in contrast to the BUF, George ensured that the anti-fascist protesters were seen as non-violent.

"A group of comrades captured one of Mosley's Blackshirts and were heading towards the river with the intention of throwing him in. My grandfather persuaded them that if he died it would create a martyr, so they let him go."

There is an account of this incident written from a Fascists' perspective, John Charnley, a Blackshirt originally from Hull, mentions it in his 1990 account of his time in the BUF:

It was in one of these sweeps that Ned Warburton was felled. he was cut off and carried struggling by a group of Reds who were going to 'chuck him in the river'. Fortunately, a group of uncommitted locals outside a pub saw the incident, attacked the Reds and rescued him, bandaged his head and got him back to the Blackshirts during a lull in the fighting. 

Reports of the event show vast differences between the police and press reports; The police were naturally keen to demonstrate that they competently and successfully handled a difficult situation, while the press were keen to sell papers and sensationalise the events. Vincent Collier supplied the press with sensational reports. Edward 'Ned' Warburton  was one of the two Blackshirts injured at Stockton, losing the sight in one eye. Collier claimed the injury was due to being struck by a potato which had a cutthroat razor blade embedded in it, Ned's brother John stated it was a stone. The myth was further elaborated upon in Richard Bellamy's We Marched with Mosley. The contemporary Newspaper accounts and Bellamy's accounts have been, until very recently, the only sources; leading to a number of implausible misinterpretations which glorify the violence.

Aftermath
The Battle of Stockton was a hugely significant setback for the BUF on Teesside; resulting in Michael Jordan, who had been with Mosley in the New Party, submitting a long and rather acrimonious resignation letter. He left the movement taking a number of experienced activists with him. The diminished BUF relocated to Middlesbrough; in an interview recorded shortly before his death George Short says:

"In Middlesbrough they learnt their lesson, they held no outdoor meeting, instead they held them in Middlesbrough Town Hall." – 

George Short's continued anti-fascist campaign ensured that, despite relocating, the BUF never established a foothold on Teesside. Communists continued to disrupt BUF meetings; after Mosley himself tried to speak at Middlesbrough Town Hall, which resulting in damage to the Town Hall, local councillors objected to rate payers footing the bill for policing. Hereafter the local authorities prevented the BUF from hiring halls anywhere on Teesside.

Three years later George was still resisting Fascism, not just locally and nationally, but now internationally; he vetted and organised the twenty-one Volunteers  for Liberty from Teesside who fought in the XV International Brigade for the Spanish Republican government during the Spanish Civil War.

"My job became a very difficult job because comrades who wanted to go to Spain had to report to me. When these lads fell, it was my job to go and visit their relatives and explain to them that they had fallen, and it was a very hard job." –

Commemoration
in 2012 the Folk Trio The Young'uns released The Battle of Stockton on their When our Grandfathers said no album.

Inspired by the 2011 article by David Walsh, in August 2017 an organisation called The Battle of Stockton Campaign (BoS) was founded in order to commemorate the event. On 9 September 2018, a plaque marking the battle was unveiled at the Market Cross by the town's mayor, Eileen Johnson. Other speakers at the commemoration were Stockton North MP Alex Cunningham, North-East MEP Jude Kirton-Darling, actress and President of the International Brigade Memorial Trust Marlene Sidaway, the convener of Cable Street 80; David Rosenberg and Unison's Claire Williams.

See also
 Battle of South Street- an incident between BUF members and anti-fascists in Worthing on 9 October 1934.
 Battle of Cable Street - a later and larger battle between the London Metropolitan Police and anti-fascists in London in 1936.

Further reading
 Serdiville, Rosie (2018). The Battle of Stockton: How a Small Town Saw Off Fascists in 1933. Durham: The Historical Association. 
The Teesside International Brigade Memorial

References

External links
Battle of Stockton Campaign Group
Stockton's International Brigade Memorial

1933 in England
History of County Durham
Fascism in England
Anti-fascism in the United Kingdom
Political riots
Riots and civil disorder in England
Battles and conflicts without fatalities
Battle
20th century in the United Kingdom
September 1933 events
1933 riots
1933 protests